The 1992 Men's Woolwich World Outdoor Bowls Championship was held at Beach House Park, Worthing, England, from 8 to 23 August 1992.  

The 1992 Women's Henselite World Championship was held at the Northfield Bowling Complex in Ayr, Scotland, from 6 to 20 June 1992.

Medallists

Results

Men's singles – round robin 
Section A

Section B

Third place playoff
 Rabkin bt  Thomas 25–24

Final
 Allcock bt  Corsie 25–20

Men's pairs – round robin 
Section A

Section B

Third-place playoff
 Canada bt  Fiji 19–17

Final
 Scotland bt  Ireland 35–14

Men's triples – round robin 
Section A

Section B

+ replacement

Third-place playoff
 Scotland bt  England 24–14

Final
 Israel bt  South Africa 23–11

Men's fours – round robin 
Section A

Section B

Third-place playoff
 South Africa bt  Wales 21–15

Final
 Scotland bt  Canada 18–15

W.M.Leonard Trophy

Women's singles – round robin 
Section A

Section B

Third-place playoff
 Shaw bt  James 25–10

Final
 Johnston bt  Rutherford 25–10

Women's pairs – round robin
Section A

Section B

Third-place playoff
 Zambia bt  New Zealand 18–14

Final
 Ireland bt  Jersey 23–11

Women's triples – round robin
Section A

Section B

+ Replacement

Third-place playoff
 England bt  Wales 18–14

Final
 Scotland bt  New Zealand 27–16

Women's fours – round robin
Section A

Section B

Third-place playoff
 England bt  Australia 22–2

Final
 Scotland bt  New Zealand 22–21

Taylor Trophy

+ Scotland by virtue of +320 shots to +246 shots.

References 

World Outdoor Bowls Championship
1992 in bowls
August 1992 sports events in the United Kingdom
1992 in English sport